Beastmaster is a Canadian television series that aired from 1999 to 2002. It was loosely based on a 1982 MGM film The Beastmaster. The series aired 66 episodes over three complete seasons. It was produced by Coote/Hayes Productions.

Series overview

Episodes

Season 1 (1999–2000)

Season 2 (2000–01)

Season 3 (2001–02)

External links 
 

Lists of American action television series episodes
Lists of Australian drama television series episodes
Lists of American fantasy television series episodes
Lists of Canadian television series episodes